Quart is a village in the province of Girona and autonomous community of Catalonia, Spain.

Between 1892 and 1969, the village was connected to the city of Girona and the port of Sant Feliu de Guíxols by the narrow gauge Sant Feliu de Guíxols–Girona railway The line has since been converted into a greenway..

References

External links

 Government data pages 

Municipalities in Gironès